Irina Fedorova may refer to:

 Irina Victorovna Fedorova, Russian Antarctic scientist
 Irina Konstantinovna Feodorova, Soviet historian

See also
 Irina Fedotova (disambiguation)
 Fedorov